The 1940 United States presidential election in Michigan took place on November 5, 1940, as part of the 1940 United States presidential election. Voters chose 19 representatives, or electors, to the Electoral College, who voted for president and vice president.

Michigan was narrowly won by the Republican candidate Wendell Willkie over Democratic incumbent Franklin D. Roosevelt by 6,926 votes in the closest race in any statewide presidential election since 1916 when Woodrow Wilson won by 56 votes in New Hampshire and opponent Charles Evans Hughes won in Minnesota by 392 votes. Willkie received 49.85% of ballots cast, while Roosevelt received 49.52%. This was the only election where Michigan supported Roosevelt's opponent, as well as the last election until 1976 that Michigan voted for a different candidate than Pennsylvania.

Results

Results by county

See also
 United States presidential elections in Michigan

References

Michigan
1940
1940 Michigan elections